TPP may refer to:

Science and technology

Chemistry
 Tripolyphosphate, a sodium salt of the polyphosphate penta-anion
 Thiamine pyrophosphate, an enzyme cofactor
 Tetraphenylporphyrin, a synthetic heterocyclic compound that resembles naturally occurring porphyrins
 Triphenylphosphine, an organophosphorus compound commonly used in chemical synthesis

Computing and mathematics
 Tangential proper part, a relation in region connection calculus
 Targeted projection pursuit, a statistical technique for data exploration, feature selection and information visualisation
 Transformation Priority Premise, a programming approach that simplifies test-driven development
 Traveling purchaser problem, an NP-hard problem generalizing the traveling salesman problem
 Trans-Proteomic Pipeline, open-source bioinformatics software

Energy
 Thermal power plant is a power station in which heat energy is converted to electric power.

Medicine
 Thrombotic thrombocytopenic purpura, a disorder of the blood-coagulation system
 Thyrotoxic periodic paralysis, a condition featuring attacks of muscle weakness in the presence of hyperthyroidism

Entertainment
 Twitch Plays Pokémon, an interactive video channel
 Metal Gear Solid V: The Phantom Pain, a 2015 stealth video game
 Third-person perspective, a style of virtual camera system for 3D games

Politics
 Trans-Pacific Partnership, a defunct proposed trade agreement between 12 Pacific Rim countries 
 Comprehensive and Progressive Agreement for Trans-Pacific Partnership, the successor agreement between all original TPP members except the United States
 Taiwan People's Party, a political party in Taiwan
 Tayo (political party), a political association in Somalia
 Two-party-preferred vote, a measure of election outcomes in Australia's preferential-voting system

Other uses
 Cad. FAP Guillermo del Castillo Paredes Airport (IATA code), Peru
 Total Package Procurement, a former US military systems acquisition policy 
 Chartered Transport planning professional (UK), a professional qualification for transport planners
 Terminal Procedures Publication, the U.S. Federal Aviation Administration's instrument approach procedure
 The Phoenix Partnership, a health software company
 The President's Pleasure (Singapore) (TPP), a legal punishment in Singapore, which serves as indefinite detention of minors or people or unsound mind for capital offences

See also
 TPP Nikola Tesla, a power-plant complex in Serbia